The Bonaire People's Movement (MPB) is a Dutch local political party in the special municipality of Bonaire.

History 
The Bonaire People's Movement was founded in 2013 by Elvis Tjin Asjoe and Hennyson Thielman. The party received the most votes in the 2015 island council election, winning three seats. It also won the 2019 island council election, winning four seats. In September 2020, island councillor Daisy Coffie left the party but retained her seat, reducing the number of seats to three.

References 

Political parties in Bonaire